EOQ may refer to:

Economic order quantity (also known as EOQ Model), an economic model for inventory management
European Organization for Quality, European organization acting for the development and management of quality in its widest sense